Samuel Samuel (7 April 1855 – 23 October 1934) was a British businessman and Conservative Party politician. He sat in the House of Commons from 1913 to 1934, and had extensive investments in East Asia. He was one of the founders of the company that would become Shell.

Biography 
Samuel, born in London, into an Iraqi Jewish family who settled in the East End of London, founded Samuel Samuel & Co in Yokohama, Japan, in partnership with his elder brother Marcus Samuel, creator of the Shell Transport and Trading company. The opening of this trading company helped pave the way for the industrialization of Japan, and Japan's thirst for fuel.

Samuel unsuccessfully contested Leeds West at the 1906 and January 1910 general elections, and was unsuccessful again in Sunderland at the December 1910 general election.

He was elected as the Member of Parliament (MP) for Wandsworth at a by-election in June 1913, following the resignation of Sir Henry Kimber, Bt. The constituency was divided at the 1918 general election, when he was returned as a Coalition Conservative for the new Putney division of Wandsworth. He held the seat until his death on the 23rd October 1934, aged 79.

References

External links 
 
 Samuel Samuel Portrait at the National Portrait Gallery

English Jews
English businesspeople
1855 births
1934 deaths
Conservative Party (UK) MPs for English constituencies
UK MPs 1910–1918
UK MPs 1918–1922
UK MPs 1922–1923
UK MPs 1923–1924
UK MPs 1924–1929
UK MPs 1929–1931
UK MPs 1931–1935
English people of Iraqi-Jewish descent
Jewish British politicians
British politicians of Iraqi descent